The Percussive Arts Society (PAS) is a non-profit organization for professional percussionists and percussion educators. It was founded in 1961 in the United States and has over 5,000 members in 40 American chapters, with another 28 chapters abroad. It is headquartered in Indianapolis, Indiana. Since 1976, the organization hosts the annual Percussive Arts Society International Convention (PASIC) which is the largest convention for drummers and percussionists in the world.

PAS developed an influential list of drum rudiments called the PAS 40 International Snare Drum Rudiments, which are considered to be the current standard reference on the subject.

The Percussive Arts Society publishes Percussive Notes, a bimonthly academic journal started in 1963, and previously published the magazine Rhythm! Scene from 2014 until it became the official blog of the organization starting in 2020. It also previously published Percussionist (later renamed Percussive Notes Research Edition) until its functions were combined with Percussive Notes.

Rhythm! Discovery Center
The Percussive Arts Society owns and manages the Rhythm! Discovery Center at its downtown Indianapolis headquarters. Opened in 2009, the  museum houses an 800-piece collection, with rotating exhibits and interactive programming.

PAS Hall of Fame 
The PAS Hall of Fame recognizes percussionists for their body of work, achievements, and or service to the organization. It was founded in 1972.

See also
List of music museums
List of attractions and events in Indianapolis

References

External links 

Music organizations based in the United States
Music education organizations
Non-profit organizations based in Indianapolis
Percussion organizations
Museums in Indianapolis